Hagerty High School is a public secondary school in Oviedo, Florida, United States. The school is part of Seminole County Public Schools. It is the academic and athletic rival school of Oviedo High School.  
In 2015, Hagerty High School was ranked 1st of 18 high schools in the Seminole County Public Schools by U.S. News & World Report.

History 
In 2000, the site of Hagerty High School was Lawton Chiles Middle School. In the fall of 2004, the school moved to its current location at Sanctuary Drive, and construction started on Hagerty, and the school opened a year later in 2005, to help the influx of kids at Oviedo High School.

Extracurricular activities
Hagerty High School has athletic programs in lacrosse, volleyball, tennis, swimming, golf, football, cheerleading, cross country, bowling, weightlifting, track and field, basketball, water polo, soccer, softball, wrestling, and baseball. Hagerty is in the Seminole Athletic Conference.

Demographics 
2,419 students attend HHS. The student body consists of 64.4% White students, 20.3% Hispanic students, 6% Asian students, 5.9% Black students, 2.6% Multi-racial students, 0.6% Pacific Islander students, and 0.2% Native American students. 51% of the students are female, and 49% of the students are male. 11.3% of the students are gifted.

Notable alumni

 Jeff Driskel, National Football League (NFL) quarterback 
 Zach Eflin, Major League Baseball (MLB) pitcher 
 Riley Greene, MLB outfielder
 Ryan Mountcastle, MLB infielder
 Vaughn Grissom, MLB infielder

References

External links
Paul J. Hagerty High School (home page)
Seminole County Public Schools

Seminole County Public Schools
High schools in Seminole County, Florida
Public high schools in Florida
2005 establishments in Florida
Educational institutions established in 2005